Yentl is a play by Leah Napolin and Isaac Bashevis Singer.

Based on Singer's short story "Yentl the Yeshiva Boy," it centers on a young woman who defies tradition by discussing and debating Jewish law and theology with her rabbi father. When he dies, she cuts her hair, dresses as a man, and sets out to find a yeshiva where she can continue to study Talmud and live secretly as a male named Anshel. When her study partner Avigdor discovers the truth, she is conflicted about pursuing a relationship with him because it will compromise her higher calling. The play focuses on the spiritual equality of women in a segregated Jewish society that does not see women as equals to men, but at the same time prioritizes religion and relationship to God above all else. More generally, the play's conflict is between one's need for self-actualization and the demands of society as well as one's baser desires.

Production 
The Broadway production of Yentl premiered at the Eugene O'Neill Theatre on October 15, 1975, played eleven previews, opened on October 23, 1975, and ran for 223 performances, concluding on May 2, 1976. It was directed by Robert Kalfin. The cast included Tovah Feldshuh, John Shea, and Lynn Ann Leveridge. It was produced by Cheryl Crawford, Moe Septee, and associate producer Paul B. Berkowsky. Scenic design was by Karl Eigsti, with costumes designed by Carrie F. Robbins, lighting designed by William Mintzer, hair design by Patrick Moreton. The general manager was Paul B. Berkowsky, the company manager was Gino Giglio, the production stage manager was Clint Jakeman, the stage manager was Richard Manheim, and the general press representative was Betty Lee Hunt.

Cast 

 Hy Anzell – Mordecai / Feitl
 Herman O. Arbeit – Treitl / Reb Alter
 Mary Ellen Ashley – Rivka / Necheleh / Chambermaid
 Robin Bartlett – Raizeleh / Avram
 Stephen dePietri – Shmuel / Zisheh / Dr. Chanina / Musician
 Blanche Dee – Pesheh
 David Eric – Moishe / Gershon / Musician
 Tovah Feldshuh – Yentl
 Elaine Grollman – Ziateh
 Rita Karin – Yachna
 Lynn Ann Leveridge – Hadass
 Leland Moss – Lemmel / Yussel / Wedding Jester / Dr. Solomon / Mohel / Musician
 Albert M Ottenheimer – Nehemiah / The Rabbi / Sheftel
 Bernie Passeltiner – Reb Todrus / Laibish / The Cantor / Messenger / Musician
 Natalie Priest – Frumka
 Reuben Schafer – Reb Nata / The Shamus / Zelig
 Madeline Shaw – Zelda-Leah / Shimmel
 John V. Shea – Avigdor
 Michael James Strafford – Dovid / Yitzhok / Musician
 Diane Tarleton – Finki / Berel

Screen adaptation

As early as 1968, Barbra Streisand had expressed interest in a film adaptation of Singer's short story. Using the Napolin/Singer play as her source material, she wrote a detailed forty-two page treatment, the first to conceive of the movie version as a musical. The resulting 1983 production veered dramatically from the original short story and play by allowing Yentl to reveal her true feelings for Avigdor and having her return to her female self and sail for the United States at the end.

The film received a scathing review from Singer, who was particularly taken aback by Streisand's monopolization of the production to its detriment: 

The film was well received by others, however, including reviewers at Time, Variety and Newsweek. Box office receipts were also healthy, both domestically and internationally, and the film was ranked 19th in the year's moneymakers. At awards time, Streisand was snubbed at the Oscars, but the film itself received five statuettes, notably winning for Best Original Music Score. Yentl won two Golden Globe Awards for Best Director and Best Motion Picture (Musical or Comedy).

Awards and nominations

See also
 Cross-dressing in film and television
 Yentl Syndrome

References

Bibliography
 Napoleon, Davi.  Chelsea on the Edge: The Adventures of an American Theater. Includes a chapter on Yentl, the story, the play, and the movie. The dramatic chapter goes into detail about several controversies between strong individuals—Isaac B Singer and Kalfin, Kalfin and Feldshuh, Singer and Streisand, and Kalfin and Streisand. It also includes descriptions of the play and movie. Iowa State University Press. , 1991.

External links
 
 
 
 Yentl - 15 Years
 Barbra Archives: Yentl page

1975 plays
Broadway plays
Jewish American plays
LGBT-related plays
Yiddish words and phrases
Plays based on short fiction
American plays adapted into films
Plays set in Poland
Fiction set in 1873
Works by Isaac Bashevis Singer
Fictional Jewish women
Fictional cross-dressers
Cross-dressing in literature